Peter Christopher Roland Nattrass (born 15 October 1941) is a Perth-based Australian gynaecologist, businessman, and politician. He was the Lord Mayor of the City of Perth from 1995 to 2007.

Biography
Peter was born to Joyce Nattrass and Roland Nattrass, a consultant gynaecologist in Perth's public hospitals.  He attended Hale School, University of Western Australia (UWA) and the Royal College of Obstetricians and Gynaecologists (RCOG) in London. He began private practice in 1975.

Public life
Nattrass entered local politics in 1977. His political career culminated in his election as Lord Mayor of Perth in 1995 succeeding Reg Withers. He was elected to the council in 1977.  He was re-elected Lord Mayor in 1999 and again in 2003. His term in the office of Lord Mayor is the longest held for the City of Perth.

Nattrass was succeeded by the first female Lord Mayor of Perth, Lisa Scaffidi on 21 October 2007.

Nattrass is a member of civic and planning commissions, Rotary, the Western Australian Trotting Association and the Royal King's Park Tennis Club and the Royal Perth Yacht Club. His family owns the Crawley Edge Boatshed.

See also
 List of mayors and lord mayors of Perth

References

1941 births
Living people
Mayors and Lord Mayors of Perth, Western Australia
People educated at Hale School
Australian gynaecologists